Asaperda is a genus of beetles in the family Cerambycidae, containing the following species:

 Asaperda agapanthina Bates, 1873
 Asaperda bicostata Hayashi, 1956
 Asaperda chongqingensis Chen & Chiang, 1993
 Asaperda maculosa Pic, 1927
 Asaperda meridiana Matsusushita, 1931
 Asaperda rufa Breuning, 1954
 Asaperda rufipes Bates, 1873
 Asaperda stenostola Kraatz, 1873
 Asaperda sylvicultrix Toyoshima & Iwata, 1990
 Asaperda tenuicornis Komiya, 1984
 Asaperda wadai Makihara, 1980

References

 
Beetles described in 1873
Cerambycidae genera